The following is the final results of the 1985 World Wrestling Championships. Freestyle competition were held in Budapest, Hungary and Greco-Roman competition were held in Kolbotn, Norway.

Medal table

Team ranking

Medal summary

Men's freestyle

Men's Greco-Roman

References
FILA Database

World Wrestling Championships
W
W
W
International wrestling competitions hosted by Hungary
International wrestling competitions hosted by Norway